"Fast Food Song" is a song made famous by British-based band Fast Food Rockers, although it existed long before they recorded it, as a popular children's playground song. The chorus is based on the Moroccan folk tune "A Ram Sam Sam" and mentions fast food restaurants McDonald's, Kentucky Fried Chicken and Pizza Hut.

The song was released on 16 June 2003 as the lead single from their album It's Never Easy Being Cheesy. The song was highly successful in the United Kingdom, reaching number two on the UK Singles Chart and number one on the Scottish Singles Chart. The song also achieved minor chart success worldwide and reached number 24 on the Irish Charts and number 56 on the Australian ARIA Singles Chart. The song was co-written and produced by Mike Stock. The band are widely considered to be a one-hit wonder, though their two follow up singles "Say Cheese (Smile Please)" and "I Love Christmas" both achieved moderate success in the UK Singles Chart, reaching numbers 10 and 25, respectively. One version was written for Butlins, where the lyrics were changed.

The original version of this song was written and recorded in Dutch by Eric Dikeb, called "Pizza-ha-ha", even though it is better known as "De Pizza Hut". "Fast Food Song" is only one of the many adaptations of the Dutch original. Other versions include "De Pizzadans", recorded by Dynamite, which was a hit in Belgium, and "Burger Dance" by DJ Ötzi and Dikeb, which reached number one in Germany.

Track listings
All tracks were written by Mike Stock, Steve Crosby, Sandy Rass, Eric Dikeb, Martin Neumayer, and Bob Patmore.

UK CD single and Dutch maxi-CD single
 "Fast Food Song" ('Deep Pan' radio mix) – 3:10
 "Fast Food Song" (Extra Large 'Deep Pan' radio mix) – 4:16
 "Fast Food Song" (Shanghai Surprise 'Go Large' club mix) – 6:05
 "Fast Food Song" (Sing-A-Long-A-Fast-Food) – 3:08
 "Fast Food Song" (video)

UK cassette single
 "Fast Food Song" ('Deep Pan' radio mix) – 3:10
 "Fast Food Song" (Sing-A-Long-A-Fast-Food) – 3:08

Charts

Weekly charts

Year-end charts

Certifications

Release history

DJ Ötzi version

A version recorded by Austrian singer DJ Ötzi featuring Eric Dikeb was released in July 2003 titled "Burger Dance". It reached number one in Germany, number three in Austria, and number seven in Switzerland.

The song is based on the original Dutch "Pizza ha-ha", including the parts that invite audience participation. It therefore also uses samples of "A Ram Sam Sam" and some sections of "The Battle Hymn of the Republic" particularly "Glory Glory Hallelujah".

Track listing
German maxi-single
 "Burger Dance" (party version) – 3:24
 "Summer of 69" – 3:21
 "Burger Dance" (international remix) – 3:17
 "Burger Dance" (single version) – 3:42
 "Burger Dance" (karaoke version) – 3:24

Charts

Weekly charts

Year-end charts

Certifications

References

2003 debut singles
2003 songs
Fast Food Rockers songs
Number-one singles in Scotland
Number-one singles in Germany
Polydor Records singles
Songs written by Mike Stock (musician)
UK Independent Singles Chart number-one singles